The 1997 Chicago Cubs season was the 126th season of the Chicago Cubs franchise, the 122nd in the National League and the 82nd at Wrigley Field. The Cubs finished fifth and last in the National League Central with a record of 68–94. The team never had a record above .500 at any point during the season.

The Cubs lost the first 14 games of the season, before finally winning the second game of a double-header against the New York Mets. The 0-14 start brought the superstition of the "billy goat curse" to the forefront, and at one point a goat was actually led around Wrigley Field in an effort to end the curse.

This was also Harry Caray's final season as broadcaster for the Cubs, as he died on February 18, 1998 (two months after his grandson Chip Caray was hired to share play-by-play duties with him). The team would wear a patch with his likeness that year.

Offseason
December 10, 1996: Mel Rojas was signed as a free agent with the Chicago Cubs.

Regular season
June 16 – The first interleague game between the Chicago Cubs and Chicago White Sox took place at the new Comiskey Park. The Cubs won the game by a score of 8-3.

Opening Day Starters

Season standings

Record vs. opponents

Notable Transactions
 July 12, 1997: Carlos Zambrano was signed by the Chicago Cubs as an amateur free agent.
 August 8, 1997: Brian McRae was traded by the Chicago Cubs with Mel Rojas and Turk Wendell to the New York Mets for players to be named later and Lance Johnson. The New York Mets sent Mark Clark (August 11, 1997) and Manny Alexander (August 14, 1997) to the Chicago Cubs to complete the trade.
 August 11, 1997: Mark Clark was sent by the New York Mets to the Chicago Cubs to complete an earlier deal made on August 8, 1997. The New York Mets sent players to be named later and Lance Johnson to the Chicago Cubs for Brian McRae, Mel Rojas, and Turk Wendell. The New York Mets sent Mark Clark (August 11, 1997) and Manny Alexander (August 14, 1997) to the Chicago Cubs to complete the trade.

Roster

Player stats

Batting

Starters by position 
Note: Pos = Position; G = Games played; AB = At bats; H = Hits; Avg. = Batting average; HR = Home runs; RBI = Runs batted in

Other batters 
Note: G = Games played; AB = At bats; H = Hits; Avg. = Batting average; HR = Home runs; RBI = Runs batted in

Pitching

Starting pitchers 
Note: G = Games pitched; IP = Innings pitched; W = Wins; L = Losses; ERA = Earned run average; SO = Strikeouts

Other pitchers 
Note: G = Games pitched; IP = Innings pitched; W = Wins; L = Losses; ERA = Earned run average; SO = Strikeouts

Relief pitchers 
Note: G = Games pitched; W = Wins; L = Losses; SV = Saves; ERA = Earned run average; SO = Strikeouts

Farm system 

LEAGUE CHAMPIONS: AZL Cubs

References

1997 Chicago Cubs season at Baseball Reference

Chicago Cubs seasons
Chicago Cubs season
Cub